François-Henri Jacques-Marie Robert Houbart (born 26 December 1952) is a French church and concert organist, improviser, composer of classical music, and pedagogue. He is often considered one of France's finest organists.

Biography 
Houbart was born in Orléans in the Loiret department. He first took up piano lessons at the age of seven and organ at the age of eleven.

He later received his musical education from Michel Chapuis, Suzanne Chaisemartin, Pierre Lantier, Jean Guillou, and Pierre Cochereau. He has been organiste titulaire of the grand organ at the Église de la Madeleine, in Paris since 1979, succeeding Odile Pierre, and taught organ at the Orléans Academy of Music from 1980 to 2000 (succeeding Marie-Claire Alain). He is an Officier of l'Ordre des Arts et des Lettres, and is also a recipient of the Médaille de Vermeil de la Ville de Paris. He is also an organ soloist with Radio France.

Houbart is a renowned improviser and has given over 1,300 concerts across three continents: Asia, North America, and Europe. Improvisation is a large factor in his recitals. Additionally, he has written two essays regarding the grand organ of Orléans Cathedral in his hometown.

He was nominated for a Grammy Award for an album with the works of Nadia Boulanger that he participated in, recorded at La Madeleine; in January 2018.

References 

1952 births
French classical organists
French male organists
Living people
Musicians from Orléans
Officiers of the Ordre des Arts et des Lettres
Chevaliers of the Légion d'honneur
21st-century organists
Male classical organists